Chah Alahiyeh (also Romanized as Chāh Ālahīyeh; also known as Chāh-e Khowīd Kīhā) is a village in Bahadoran Rural District, in the Central District of Mehriz County, Yazd Province, Iran. At the 2006 census, its population was 12, in 4 families.

References 

Populated places in Mehriz County